St. Mary Church in  Trakai, Lithuania, is a Roman Catholic church. It was founded by Vytautas the Great in 1409 and constructed in gothic style. Later it was significantly altered during the Baroque period, and its current appearance is mostly defined by these alterations. The main altarpiece contains the icon, The Mother of God of Trakai.

Sources
 Tomasz Krzywick. Litwa: przewodnik, Oficyna Wydawnicza "Rewasz", 2005, p. 402 (in Polish).

Buildings and structures in Trakai
Roman Catholic churches in Lithuania
Tourist attractions in Vilnius County